Hilarographa temburonga is a species of moth of the family Tortricidae. It is found in Brunei.

The wingspan is about 16 mm. The ground colour of the forewings is white cream, forming two transverse fasciae in the basal half of the wing, divided by parallel olive ochreous fasciae which are concolorous with a basal blotch and brown edged costal divisions. The dorso-posterior area is cream tinged ochreous and pale orange marbled with olive brownish. The hindwings are white mixed pale orange and dotted brownish in the apical third.

Etymology
The name refers to the type locality.

References

Moths described in 2009
Hilarographini